Alkitrang Dugo is a 1975 Filipino film based on the 1954 novel Lord of the Flies by English novelist Sir William Golding.

Plot
A group of young Filipino athletes find themselves stranded on an uninhabited island after their plane crashes, claiming the lives of both their pilot and coach. Luis organizes the group and appoints himself leader. They find fresh water and gather coconuts. They then tried to build a shelter and tried to start a fire to keep warm and alert passing ships of their whereabouts, but Andy wants to stay on this island forever, because he is more interested in playing Indians and hunting wild game, and it soon becomes evident that he is unhappy with Luis's leadership. Andy challenges Luis to a proper vote, resulting in a division amongst the group, half in favor of Andy and half in favor of Luis. What follows is a rapid decline into all out war between the two groups.

Cast
Roderick Paulate as Andy
Eddie Villamayor as Luis
Toto Jr. as Nilo
Margie Braza as Clarita
Jingle as Glenda
Angelito as Ricky
Efren Montes as Brooks
Zernan Manahan as Lando
Rinna Peredo as Velvy
Michael Sandico as Angelo
Ricky Sandico as Biko

Differences between the book and the film
The film depicts boys and girls stranded on the island together, while in the book there were only boys.
In the book, the children elect a leader shortly after being stranded on the island; in the film, the election does not take place until they have already been on the island for several weeks.

Location
The movie was set on location at Lipata, Padre Burgos, Quezon.

Awards and nominations

References

External links

1975 films
Filipino-language films
Films based on British novels
Philippine drama films